Wilmot is a locality and small rural community in the local government area of Kentish in the North West region of Tasmania.
The 2016 census determined a population of 298 for the state suburb of Wilmot.

History
Wilmot was a parish name prior to 1900 but no town of that name had been surveyed. A Wilmot post station existed in 1899. The town name was proclaimed in 1903, and Wilmot was gazetted as a locality in 1965. The former locality of Narrawa was incorporated into Wilmot in 2000. The locality was named for Sir John Eardley-Wilmot, 1st Baronet, Lieutenant Governor of Van Diemen's Land (now Tasmania) from 1843 to 1846.

Geography
Lake Barrington forms the eastern boundary, and the Wilmot River forms almost all of the western boundary.

Road infrastructure
The C132 route (Wilmot Road) passes through the locality from north to south. Route C133 (Back Road) starts at an intersection with C132 and runs north before exiting to the north-west. Route C135 (Buxtons Road / Lake Barrington Road) forms a loop between two intersections with C132, providing access to Lake Barrington.

Notes

References

Localities of Kentish Council
Towns in Tasmania